ShaSimone is a British-Ghanaian singer-rapper.

Discography

Singles and EPs 

 2020: Belly (single)
 2021: Supersize (single)
 2021: No Chaser (single)
 2021: Back To Sender (single)
 2021: Hushpuppi (single)

As featured artist 

 2021: Both Sides of a Smile (track from Dave's We're All Alone in This Together album)
 2021: Again (Remix)

References 

British rappers

Ghanaian rappers

Living people

Year of birth missing (living people)